Catalyst Pharmaceuticals Inc. is a biopharmaceutical company based in Coral Gables, Florida. The company is developing medicines for rare diseases, including the phosphate salt of amifampridine for the treatment of Lambert–Eaton myasthenic syndrome (LEMS). The drug is referred to under the trade name Firdapse, which was approved by the FDA for approved use in children 6 years and older with LEMS in addition to the prior approval for use in adults with LEMS on November 28, 2018. Firdapse commercially launched in January 2019.

History
Catalyst was founded in 2002, and completed an IPO in 2006. It focused primarily on developing therapies to prevent addiction until 2012.

In 2009, Catalyst in-licensed worldwide rights to a family of GABA inhibitors including CPP-115 from Northwestern University. In 2012, it in-licensed patents covering the use of amifampridine phosphate to treat LEMS for the North American market from BioMarin.

In 2012, while BioMarin had a Phase III trial ongoing in the US, it licensed the US rights to 3,4-DAPP, including the orphan designation and the ongoing trial, to Catalyst Pharmaceuticals.

In August 2013, analysts anticipated that FDA approval would be granted to Catalyst in LEMS by 2015. The drug is used to treat Lambert–Eaton myasthenic syndrome (LEMS), which is a rare neuromuscular disorder characterized by muscle weakness of the limbs, affecting about 3.4 per million people.

In December 2015, Catalyst submitted its new drug application to the FDA, and in February 2016 the FDA refused to accept it, on the basis that it wasn't complete. In April 2016 the FDA told Catalyst it would have to gather further data. In March 2018 the company re-submitted its NDA. The FDA approved amifampridine for the treatment of adults with Lambert-Eaton myasthenic syndrome on November 29, 2018.

In 2018, Catalyst terminated its license for CPP-115 with Northwestern and stopped the development program for that compound.

As of 2022, the company offered Catalyst Pathways, a program that provides financial aid, insurance navigation, bridge medicine, and Patient Access Liaisons.

Lambert-Eaton myasthenic syndrome
Tentative evidence supports 3,4-diaminopyridine treatment at least for a few weeks, with the goal to improve neuromuscular transmission. The 3,4-diaminopyridine base or the water-soluble 3,4-diaminopyridine phosphate may be used. Both 3,4-diaminopyridine formulations stall the repolarization of nerve terminals after a discharge, allowing more calcium to gather in the terminal.

Amifampridine
The development of amifampridine and its phosphate has brought attention to orphan drug policies that grant market exclusivity as an incentive for companies to develop therapies for conditions that affect small numbers of people.
Amifampridine, also called 3,4-DAP, was discovered in Scotland in the 1970s, and doctors in Sweden first showed its use in LEMS in the 1980s.

Litigation and Reception
In December 2015 a group of neuromuscular doctors who had worked with both Jacobus and BioMarin/Catalyst published an editorial in the journal, Muscle & Nerve, with concerns about the potential for the price of the drug to be drastically increased should Catalyst obtain FDA approval, and stating that 3,4-DAPP represented no real innovation and didn't deserve exclusivity under the Orphan Drug Act, which was meant to spur innovation to meet unmet needs. Catalyst responded to this editorial with a response in 2016 that explained they were conducting a full range of clinical and non-clinical studies necessary to obtain approval in order to specifically address the unmet need among the estimated 1500-3000 LEMs patients since about 200 were receiving the product through compassionate use – and that this is exactly what the Orphan Drug Act was intended to do. Prior to the FDA approval, patients were able to get an investigational  version of amifampridine for free through compassionate use programs in accordance with FDA Rules and Guidelines.

On January 28, 2022, in Catalyst Pharmaceuticals, Inc. v. Becerra, the Eleventh Circuit upheld orphan exclusivity for Catalyst Pharmaceuticals and its drug Firdapse. With this decision, the Eleventh Circuit rejected the FDA’s interpretation of orphan exclusivity and concluded that the agency had improperly approved a competitor product from Jacobus Pharmaceutical Co.

On February 4, 2019, Bernie Sanders, United States Senator from Vermont, publicly sent a letter to Catalyst asking why they raised the price of their drug Firdapse to an annual cost of $375,000, considering Firdapse was previously free of charge through an FDA compassionate use program. Sanders questioned the financial decision regarding the negative impact, specifically asking about how many patients would suffer or die, for patients who may no longer be able to afford the drug. The drug is used to treat Lambert–Eaton myasthenic syndrome (LEMS), which is a rare neuromuscular disorder.

References

Biotechnology companies of the United States
Companies listed on the Nasdaq
Pharmaceutical companies established in 2002
Orphan drug companies
Biotechnology companies established in 2002
2002 establishments in Florida
Companies based in Coral Gables, Florida
Health care companies based in Florida
2006 initial public offerings